Willow Mill Complex is a complex of historic buildings located at Richboro, Northampton Township, Bucks County, Pennsylvania. The complex consists of the Shaw-Leedom House and spring house / smoke house and the Howard Sager House, wagon house, and grist mill.  The Shaw-Leedom House was built about 1800, and is a -story, five bay, stone dwelling with a gable roof in the Federal style.  It has a -story, two-bay stone wing believed to be the kitchen wing from an earlier house. The adjacent stone spring / smoke house was also built about 1800.  The Willow Mill was built in the 1840s, and is a four-story stone building converted to residential use in 1938. The Sager House was built in 1847, and is a -story, three bay, ashlar stone building.  It has a gable roof with dormers and shed roof "Dutch Stoop" kitchen wing.  Associated with it is a two-story, frame wagon house dated to the 19th century.

It was added to the National Register of Historic Places in 2002.

Gallery

References

Grinding mills on the National Register of Historic Places in Pennsylvania
Houses on the National Register of Historic Places in Pennsylvania
Federal architecture in Pennsylvania
Houses completed in 1800
Houses in Bucks County, Pennsylvania
Grinding mills in Bucks County, Pennsylvania
National Register of Historic Places in Bucks County, Pennsylvania